Ormiston Rivers Academy (formerly St Peter's High School) is a secondary school and sixth form with academy status located in Burnham-on-Crouch, Essex, England.

The school was first established in 1958 as St Peter's High School. In 2011 the school became an academy and was renamed Ormiston Rivers Academy. The school is one of many in the UK that is operated and funded by the Ormiston Academies Trust, an organisation for education in the UK.

Feeder schools
The main feeder schools in the area are:

Maylandsea Primary School
St Cedds, Bradwell-on-Sea
Latchingdon Primary School
Burnham-on-Crouch Primary
St Mary's, Burnham-on-Crouch
Purleigh Primary School
Southminster Primary School
Tillingham  St Nicholas Church of England School
Woodham Walter Church of England Primary
The Plume School

References

External links 
 

Academies in Essex
Secondary schools in Essex
Educational institutions established in 1958
1958 establishments in England
Ormiston Academies
Burnham-on-Crouch